Amblymora keyana is a species of beetle in the family Cerambycidae. It was first described by Stephan von Breuning in 1965. It is known from Moluccas.

References

Amblymora
Beetles described in 1965